Samuel Gobeil,  (August 17, 1875 – January 1, 1961) was a Canadian politician.

Born in La Patrie, Quebec, he was defeated twice (in 1925 and 1926) before being elected to the House of Commons of Canada representing the Quebec riding of Compton in the 1930 federal election. A Conservative, he was defeated in 1935 and 1940. In 1935, he was briefly the Postmaster General.

References
 

1875 births
1961 deaths
Conservative Party of Canada (1867–1942) MPs
Members of the House of Commons of Canada from Quebec
Members of the King's Privy Council for Canada